Kalayeh (also Romanized as Kalāyeh) is a village in Ziaran Rural District, in the Central District of Abyek County, Qazvin Province, Iran. At the 2006 census, its population was 23, in 5 families.

References 

Populated places in Abyek County